B. australis may refer to:
 Baptisia australis, the blue wild indigo or blue false indigo, a herbaceous perennial plant species native to North America
 Barbosella australis, an orchid species
 Brunonia australis, the blue pincushion or cornflower, a perennial herbaceous plant species found in Australia
 Botryosphaeria australis, a synonym for Neofusicoccum australe, a fungus species

See also 
 Australis (disambiguation)